The Kamensk Ironworks hospital building is a large building in the historical center of Kamensk-Uralsky, Sverdlovsk oblast.

The building was designated a regionally significant monument on December 31, 1987 (decision № 535 by the executive committee of Sverdlovsk oblast Council of People's Deputies), under listing #661710794150005.

History 
The hospital was not the town's first medical institution of the town. Previously there had been hospital wards for workers, but they were dotted around the town and were not well-coordinated. 

The street network had been reorganized shortly before construction was begun on the hospital. Krasnykh Orlov Street (formerly Upper Novaya Street) was being modernized. A decision was made to build the hospital near the forest for logistical reasons and to satisfy health requirements. The hospital was located along the road from the Razgulyaevsky mine to the Kamensk Ironworks.

The Kamensk Ironworks was responsible for construction. Mikhail Pavlovich Malakhov served as architect. The project was planned in 1817 and construction began in 1826. The original plan called for a one-story neoclassical stone structure with straight lines, symmetrical composition, and minimal decoration. Later, in 1847-1849, a second floor was added, providing room for more hospital beds. The building was electrified in 1906.

Nowadays the house is residential.

Architecture 
The building is L-shaped, and featuers a wooden extension at the southern end of the facade, wind porches, and stairs inside the courtyard. The main western facade faces Krasnykh Orlov Street. Its composition is symmetrical. The central part is distinguished by a protruding rizalit topped by a triangular pediment with a stepped parapet. The large window openings are grouped in pairs. The simple cornice is continued along the entire perimeter of the building. On the other facades the original decor was lost.

The building's corridor-based floor plan was constructed atop a quarried stone foundation. The original inner decor was lost. The walls are constructed of solid brick, plastered and painted. The floors are wooden, and the roof is pitched slate on wooden rafters.

References

Literature 
 
 Памятники архитектуры Каменска-Уральского / С. И. Гаврилова, Л. В. Зенкова, А. В. Кузнецова, А. Ю. Лесунова — Екатеринбург: Банк культурной информации, 2008. — 92 с.

Sources 
 

Tourist attractions in Sverdlovsk Oblast
Buildings and structures in Kamensk-Uralsky
Cultural heritage monuments in Kamensk-Uralsky
Cultural heritage monuments of regional significance in Sverdlovsk Oblast